The 2011 end of year women's rugby tests was a series of women's rugby union matches. New Zealand toured the Northern Hemisphere, according to a three-year international test agreement signed between RFU and NZRU in August 2011: England would host three tests in the autumn of 2011 and 2012 before heading to New Zealand for three further matches in June 2013, just a year before the 2014 Women's Rugby World Cup.

Before competing with the world champions New Zealand, England played against France twice: the first game wasn't an uncapped match, while the second was a full international test. France also contested a game with Italy.

Scotland travelled to Amsterdam to take on the Netherlands after finishing last at this year's Six Nations.

That was the largest round of autumn women's rugby internationals ever seen in the game at this time of year, especially in Europe.

France vs Italy

Assistant referees:
n/a
n/a
Assessor:
n/a

France vs England (unofficial)

Assistant referees:
Hugo Joly (France)
Frédéric Saunier (France)
Assessor:
n/a

France vs England

Assistant referees:
n/a
n/a
Assessor:
n/a

Netherlands vs Scotland

Assistant referees:
Gert Visser (Netherlands)
Darron Wadey (Netherlands)
Assessor:
Thomas Muldoon (Netherlands)

England vs New Zealand (1st match)

Assistant referees:
Clare Daniels (England)
Darryl Chapman (England)
Assessor:
Bob Ockenden (England)

England vs New Zealand (2nd match)

Assistant referees:
Paul Kimber (England)
Ken Morgan (England)
Assessor:
David Warren (England)

England vs New Zealand (3rd match)

Assistant referees:
Ed Turnill (England)
Peter Crouch (England)
Assessor:
Geoff Blackburn (England)

Notes

2011 in women's rugby union
women
Women's rugby union matches
2011–12 in European women's rugby union
2011 in New Zealand rugby union
2011 in New Zealand women's sport